The courts of the Vice-Warden of the Stannaries, commonly known as the stannary courts, were English courts in Cornwall and Devon that enforced the stannary law between the High Middle Ages and their abolition by the Stannaries Court (Abolition) Act 1896. From 1201, tin miners in Devon and Cornwall were exempt from the jurisdiction of all English courts other than that of the Vice-Warden of the Stannaries. The jurisdiction of the Cornwall stannary institutions covered the whole of the duchy, while the stannary courts of Devon had a reputation for harsh justice, and once jailed a Westminster MP (Richard Strode).

According to Thomas Pitt, judgements from the court could be appealed to the Vice-Warden of the Stanneries, then to the Warden, then finally to the Prince in Council.

References

See also

Stannary law
Cornish Stannary Parliament
Stannary Convocation of Devon
Duchy of Cornwall

Politics of Cornwall
English law
History of Cornwall
Cornish mining organisations
Mining in Devon
History of Devon
Legal history of England
Culture in Devon
Dartmoor
Tin mining
Cornish culture